Funny Girls is a burlesque cabaret showbar on the North Shore of Blackpool, England, owned by English entrepreneur and businessman Basil Newby. The cast of the show comprise male dancers and drag performers. The showbar is in what was once the Blackpool Odeon, which was Odeon's largest original cinema in the United Kingdom.

Venue
The cinema was designed by Robert Bullivant and was opened on May 6, 1939. It has a capacity of 3,000 and is the largest original Odeon cinema. It was converted into a 3-screen cinema in 1975. In 1994, the building was registered as a Grade II listed building. The cinema closed on December 5, 1998.

Basil Newby took over the old Odeon in 2002 and had it re-decorated in the traditional Art Deco style. In 2019, Thwaites Brewery took over the venue but sold it back to Newby later that year.

Cast
Betty Legs Diamond is a choreographer and original 'Funny Girl'.

DJ Zoe is the compere at Funny Girls.

The Funny Girls cast have performed at various platforms including the Royal Variety Performance. They have also appeared in various television shows either to be interviewed, or where the Funny Girls showbar itself has been the backdrop, such as in the BBC Drama Blackpool.

Critical reception

References

External links 
 Official Website

Buildings and structures in Blackpool
Cabaret